Peridroma ambrosioides  is a moth of the family Noctuidae. It is found in the Valparaíso and Biobío Regions  of Chile and Buenos Aires, Bahía Blanca and Sierra de la Ventana in Argentina.

The wingspan is 35–45 mm. Adults are on wing from August to April.

External links
 Noctuinae of Chile

Noctuinae
Moths described in 1857